Tetradium daniellii, the bee-bee tree or Korean evodia, is a species of flowering plant in the family Rutaceae. It is native to Korea and southwestern China.

Tetradium daniellii var. hupehensis was formerly classed as Euodia hupehensis

References

Zanthoxyloideae